Ou Peng is a fictional character in Water Margin, one of the Four Great Classical Novels in Chinese literature. Nicknamed "Golden Wings Brushing Against the Clouds", he ranks 48th among the 108 Stars of Destiny and 12th among the 72 Earthly Fiends.

Background
Tall and muscular, Ou Peng is skilled in martial arts and could walk unusually quickly. His nickname "Golden Wings Brushing Against the Clouds" stems from his ability to catch small flying projectiles with a bare hand.

The descendant of a line of military men who had been stationed at garrisons along the Yangtze River, Ou Peng, a native of Huangzhou (黃州; in present-day Huanggang, Hubei), himself is also in the service and holds a similar post. However, he abandons the career after falling out with a superior. He decides to lead a bandit gang at Mount Yellow Gate, with Jiang Jing, Ma Lin and Tao Zongwang as his assistants.

Joining Liangshan
When Song Jiang is following the outlaws of Liangshan Marsh back to their stronghold after they and a number of heroes of the Jieyang region saved him in Jiangzhou (江州; present-day Jiujiang, Jiangxi), he comes by Mount Yellow Gate with the group. They are blocked by the bandits led by Ou Peng, who demands to know whether Song is among them. When he steps out to show himself, the four come forward to pay him homage. Learning that the group is going to Liangshan, Ou and his band want in and Song gladly agrees.

In Liangshan's second offensive against the Zhu Family Manor, Ou Peng has a dazzling fight on horseback with Hu Sanniang. Even though Ou could not get the better of Hu, he impresses Song Jiang with how he uses the spear, a skill passed down in his family.

Campaigns and death
Ou Peng is appointed as one of the leaders of the Liangshan cavalry after the 108 Stars of Destiny came together in what is called the Grand Assembly. He participates in the campaigns against the Liao invaders and rebel forces in Song territory following amnesty from Emperor Huizong for Liangshan.

In the battle of Shezhou in the campaign against Fang La, Ou Peng encounters the enemy general Pang Wanchun. Pang feigns defeat to bait Ou, who is determined to avenge comrades who had died at the hands of the expert archer, to come after him. Pang suddenly turns on horseback to fire an arrow, which Ou has no problem catching with his hand even though he is riding at a gallop. But Pang quickly follows that up with many shots, which Ou finds increasingly hard to dodge. He is eventually shot to death.

References
 
 
 
 
 
 
 

72 Earthly Fiends
Fictional characters from Hubei